Leeds Township may refer to the following townships in the United States:

 Leeds Township, Murray County, Minnesota
 Leeds Township, Benson County, North Dakota